The Women's 48 kg powerlifting event at the 2004 Summer Paralympics was competed  on 21 September. It was won by Bian Jian Xin, representing .

Final round

21 Sept. 2004, 13:00

References

W
Para